Aghnjadzor is a village in the Yeghegis Municipality of the Vayots Dzor Province in Armenia. The village had a mixed population of Azerbaijanis and Armenians before the exodus of Azerbaijanis from Armenia after the outbreak of the Nagorno-Karabakh conflict.

Cultural heritage 
One kilometer north is the site of the notable Lernantsk Caravanserai, appearing east of the road like a half-buried Quonset hut. It was built at approximately the same period as Orbelian's Caravanserai, which is also located near the village, but Lernantsk Caravanserai is smaller in size and more crudely built. Four kilometres north are the ruins of Kapuyt Berd ("Blue Fortress").

Gallery

References

External links 

 
 
 

Populated places in Vayots Dzor Province